Željko Polak (Serbian Cyrillic: Жељко Полак; born 9 March 1976) is a retired Bosnian-Herzegovinian footballer.

Club career
After playing in Serbian clubs such as FK Mačva Šabac, FK Milicionar, FK Palilulac Beograd and FK Radnički Beograd, in 2000, he moved to Germany to play in FC Carl Zeiss Jena. After not getting many chances to play, he returned and played in Serbian SuperLiga and Serbian First League with Radnički Beograd, FK Bežanija and FK Mladost Lučani.

External sources
 Profile at Srbijafudbal
 Stats from Yugoslav League at Zerodic

1976 births
Living people
Serbs of Bosnia and Herzegovina
Association football forwards
Bosnia and Herzegovina footballers
FK Mačva Šabac players
FK Rad players
FK Milicionar players
FK Palilulac Beograd players
FK Radnički Beograd players
FC Carl Zeiss Jena players
FK Bežanija players
FK Mladost Lučani players
First League of Serbia and Montenegro players
Second League of Serbia and Montenegro players
Regionalliga players
Serbian SuperLiga players
Serbian First League players
Bosnia and Herzegovina expatriate footballers
Expatriate footballers in Germany
Bosnia and Herzegovina expatriate sportspeople in Germany